Shadow in the Cloud is a 2020 action horror film directed by Roseanne Liang, from a screenplay by Liang and Max Landis, starring Chloë Grace Moretz, Beulah Koale, Taylor John Smith, Callan Mulvey and Nick Robinson. It follows a female flight officer on a top-secret mission in the Pacific during the Second World War, who after boarding a Boeing B-17 Flying Fortress, encounters an evil gremlin during the flight.

The film premiered on September 12, 2020, at the 2020 Toronto International Film Festival, where it won the People's Choice Award for Midnight Madness. It was released on January 1, 2021, by Vertical Entertainment and Redbox Entertainment.

Plot
In August 1943, RAF Pilot Officer Maude Garrett is assigned to travel with a top secret package from Auckland, New Zealand, to Samoa. When she arrives at the airbase at night, she wanders the tarmac before suddenly finding herself standing right in front of her transport, an American B-17 bomber named The Fool's Errand. The mixed-nationality Allied crew gives her a mostly derisive welcome, and she is quartered in the empty Sperry ball turret for the takeoff. With no room left for her document valise, she reluctantly allows the only friendly crew member, USAAF dorsal gunner Walter Quaid, to store it. During takeoff, Maude sees another aircraft in the clouds, confirmed by navigator Finch. Pilot Reeves and RNZAF co-pilot Williams question her ability to identify aircraft.

Still riding in the ball turret, Maude sees some sort of winged creature clinging to the underside of the bomber's wing. She reports it, but most of the crew, except tail gunner Beckell, who also sees it, derides her claim. When she is allowed to leave the turret, the hatch malfunctions, trapping her inside. When she reacts indignantly to the crew's comments about her situation, they abandon their attempt to open the stuck hatch and switch off her intercom. After seeing a Japanese aircraft appearing and disappearing in the clouds close to the bomber, she is abruptly attacked by the creature, a gremlin. She fights it off but ends up being injured. When the crew contacts her again to ask what happened, RAF Scottish radio operator Taggart cuts in telling them that "Maude Garrett" does not exist and is not registered for their flight. When they begin to remove her for questioning, Maude deliberately jams the turret's gears and prepares to defend herself. Suddenly, the Japanese aircraft reappears and opens fire. In the excitement, Maude switches to an American accent as she takes control of the gun turret, shooting down the fighter and winning the crew's grudging respect.

Maude confirms that she truly is a WASP, but admits she is actually married and boarded the B-17 under her maiden name. She refuses to reveal her mission, citing its secrecy. She again sees the gremlin continuing to sabotage the bomber. Eventually, waist gunner Dorn sights it too, but the others disregard his observation. Suspecting Maude's assignment is the cause of their misfortunes, Reeves gives the order to open the bag, which contains an infant, Maude's and Sgt. Quaid's extramarital child. Forced to confess, Maude explains that she was severely mistreated by her husband. She had an affair with Quaid and became pregnant. Deciding not to inform Quaid, Maude faked her assignment to the bomber in order to escape her husband, who is following her and will kill her in his rage over the affair.

Just as Captain Reeves turns back to the airbase, three Mitsubishi A6M Zero fighters attack and the gremlin boards the bomber, injures Quaid, and kidnaps the infant. When the gremlin appears outside the turret with her baby in the bag, Maude exits the turret and fires her handgun at it, driving it off. The bag is now hanging precariously from the closest engine nacelle. Risking a perilous climb under the wing, Maude is able to retrieve her child and reboard the bomber through the now shot away ball turret opening. The gremlin attacks again, throwing Taggart out of the bomber before Maude can eject it. When Reeves, Finch, and Dorn are killed by additional Japanese machine gun fire, Maude takes command and brings down the heavily damaged bomber roughly but safely in a controlled crash landing on land. The gremlin reappears on the ground and tries to snatch the baby once again, but Maude is finally able to kill the creature, ending the threat. She and the remaining survivors watch as The Fool's Errand burns and explodes.

Cast and characters

Production
In January 2019, it was announced that Chloë Grace Moretz had joined the cast, with Roseanne Liang directing from a screenplay by Max Landis. Brian Kavanaugh-Jones, Fred Berger, Kelly McCormick and Tom Hern would serve as producers under their Automatik Entertainment and Four Knights Film banner, respectively. In April 2019, Moretz announced the script had been rewritten several times following Landis's sexual assault allegations. Landis was also removed as a producer, with Liang rewriting the film. Due to Writers Guild of America rules, Landis receives credit for the script. That month, Nick Robinson joined the cast.

During development, for inspiration, Liang turned to Locke (2013), a film with one character set in one location, and Aliens (1986).

Principal photography began in June 2019 in Auckland, New Zealand.

In a prologue to Shadow in the Cloud, an animated training film from the United States Army Air Forces depicts the havoc a gremlin can produce for the unwary or complacent airman during wartime. When the film continues, the gremlin—a metaphor for problems caused by inattention and/or negligence—is depicted as a living, malevolent creature. During the end credits, archival footage is shown of women serving in the British and American air forces in the Second World War.

Release
Shadow in the Cloud had its world premiere at the Toronto International Film Festival on September 12, 2020. Shortly after, Vertical Entertainment and Redbox Entertainment acquired distribution rights to the film. Shadow in the Cloud was released in the United States on January 1, 2021, although the release was limited due to the COVID-19 pandemic.

Reception
The website's critical consensus reads: "Part creature feature, part war movie, and part social commentary, Shadow in the Cloud doesn't always blend its ingredients evenly—but it's frequently pulpy fun". According to Metacritic, which assigned Shadow in the Cloud a weighted average score of 66 out of 100 based on 19 critics, having received "generally favorable reviews".

Nick Allen of RogerEbert.com wrote that Shadow in the Cloud was "a sincere but silly mash-up of WWII dogfights, gremlin chaos, and feminism in action", and gave it 2.5 out of 4 stars.

Awards and honours
Shadow in the Cloud received a Grolsch People's Choice Award for Director Roseanne Liang in the "Midnight Madness" session in the 2020 Toronto International Film Festival. Liang also won the "Director to Watch" award at the 2021 Palm Springs International Film Festival.

References

External links
 
 

2020 films
2020 horror films
2020s action horror films
American action horror films
New Zealand action horror films
Vertical Entertainment films
American World War II films
World War II aviation films
Films set in 1943
Films with screenplays by Max Landis
Films about gremlins
2020 action films
2020s English-language films
2020s American films